was a Japanese football player and manager. He played for Japan national team. He also managed Japan national team.

Club career
Watanabe was born in Hiroshima on January 11, 1936. After graduating from high school, he joined Yawata Steel (later Nippon Steel) in 1954. In 1958, he left Yawata Steel and entered Rikkyo University. After graduating from Rikkyo University, he joined Yawata Steel again in 1962. In 1965, Yawata Steel joined new league Japan Soccer League. He retired in 1971. He played 79 games and scored 19 goals in the league. He was selected Best Eleven in 1968.

National team career
On December 25, 1958, when Watanabe was a Rikkyo University student, he debuted for Japan national team against Hong Kong. He played at 1964 Summer Olympics in Tokyo and 1968 Summer Olympics in Mexico City. At 1968 Summer Olympics, he played 5 games and scored 2 goals against Brazil and France. Japan also won Bronze Medal. In 2018, this team was selected Japan Football Hall of Fame. He also played at 1962 and 1966 Asian Games. He played 39 games and scored 19 goals for Japan until 1969.

Coaching career
In 1969, when Watanabe played for Yawata Steel (later Nippon Steel), he became a playing manager. He managed the club until 1975. In 1979, he became an assistant coach for Japan national team under manager Yukio Shimomura. At 1980 Asian Olympic Qualifying Tournaments in April 1980, following Japan's failure to qualify for 1980 Summer Olympics, Shimomura resigned a manager. In May, Watanabe was promoted to manager as Shimomura successor. However, just before 1982 World Cup qualification in December, he suffered a subarachnoid hemorrhage and replaced to Saburo Kawabuchi.

On December 7, 1995, Watanabe died of heart failure in Chiba at the age of 59. In 2006, he was selected Japan Football Hall of Fame.

National team statistics

Awards and honors
 Japan Soccer League Best Eleven: 1968

References

External links
 
 
 Japan National Football Team Database
 Japan Football Hall of Fame at Japan Football Association
Japan Football Hall of Fame (Japan team at 1968 Olympics) at Japan Football Association
 
 

1936 births
1995 deaths
Rikkyo University alumni
Association football people from Hiroshima Prefecture
Japanese footballers
Japan international footballers
Japan Soccer League players
Nippon Steel Yawata SC players
Japanese football managers
Japan national football team managers
Player-coaches
Olympic footballers of Japan
Olympic medalists in football
Olympic bronze medalists for Japan
Medalists at the 1968 Summer Olympics
Footballers at the 1964 Summer Olympics
Footballers at the 1968 Summer Olympics
Asian Games medalists in football
Asian Games bronze medalists for Japan
Footballers at the 1962 Asian Games
Footballers at the 1966 Asian Games
Association football forwards
Medalists at the 1966 Asian Games